Naseem Hamed vs. Augie Sanchez was a professional boxing match contested between reigning WBO featherweight champion Naseem Hamed and Augie Sanchez. The bout took place on August 19, 2000 at the Foxwoods Resort Casino in Ledyard, Connecticut.

Background
WBO featherweight champion Naseem Hamed and 22-year old prospect Augie Sanchez agreed to meet one another in June 2000 for an August title fight.  After knocking out the reigning super bantamweight champion Vuyani Bungu in the fourth round earlier in the year, Hamed and his team began negotiations for Hamed's next title fight to be against a highly-rated fighter, with Érik Morales and Marco Antonio Barrera being in the forefront. Other names such as Johnny Tapia, Danny Romero and Freddie Norwood were also mentioned, but none were able to agree to a deal.  Then-WBA super bantamweight champion Clarence emerged as the front-runner before Hamed ultimately chose to face the relatively unknown Sanchez. Sanchez had been a promising prospect, engaging in a rivalry in the amateurs with Floyd Mayweather Jr., having defeated him once in the 1996 pre-Olympic trials before losing twice to Mayweather which cost him a shot to make 1996 US Olympic boxing team. 

Hamed, who in his previous fight had promised to tone down his extravagant ring entrances, entered the ring to Black Rob's hit single "Whoa!" bursting through a wall while accompanied by explosions, lasers and Arabic chanting. Sanchez, meanwhile, entered the ring to Elvis Presley's "Viva Las Vegas" while being accompanied by four Elvis impersonators.

The Fight
The fight was an all-out war between Hamed and Sanchez, as both fighters traded power punches throughout the bout. After an uneventful first round, the action picked up in round 2 with Sanchez dropping Hamed with a right hand, though the referee bizarrely and controversially declared it a slip. At the end of the round, Sanchez landed 2-punch combination that almost sent Hamed down again, but Hamed was able to regain his footing and the two ended the round trading punches until the bell rang. The action continued early in the round 3 with Sanchez landing 2 right hands that bloodied Hamed's nose, though Hamed held onto the ropes to prevent regain his balance. Later in the round, Hamed landed a left hook that sent Sanchez to his knees, though the referee again incorrectly called that a slip as well. As the round ended Hamed began to score numerous power punches on an exhausted Sanchez and opened up a gash over Sanchez's eye. A minute into round 4, Hamed landed a left hand that again sent Sanchez stumbling into Hamed, as Sanchez hit the canvas, Hamed connected with a body shot, causing the referee to take away the potential knockdown and instead dock Hamed a point for the foul. With around 40 seconds left in the round, Hamed landed a brutal 4-punch combination that floored Sanchez, the referee immediately called the fight and awarded Hamed the victory by technical knockout. Sanchez remained on the canvas for several minutes and had had to be taken from the ring on a stretcher.

Aftermath
The fight would mark the 15th and final title defense of Hamed's WBO featherweight championship. Initially, the WBO had mandated that Hamed meet its #1 contender in István Kovács, however HBO, which had exclusive rights to air Hamed's fights in the United States, was not satisfied with Hamed taking on a virtual unknown in Kovács and only guaranteed Hamed a third of his usual purse of $6 million. Rather than fight for less money and in order to appease HBO, Hamed ultimately decided to voluntarily vacate the title. It was the third time that Hamed had to relinquish one of his titles outside the ring as earlier in 2000, the WBC stripped him after he declined to vacate his WBO version, and in 1997 the IBF stripped him as well. Though Hamed, no longer held a physical belt, he was still recognized as the "lineal" champion. 

Immediately after giving up his title, Hamed challenged reigning WBO super bantamweight champion Marco Antonio Barrera to match the following year. After months of negotiations, the fight was agreed upon in January 2001.

Fight card

References

2000 in boxing
2000 in sports in Connecticut
Boxing in Connecticut
Boxing matches